Spiritus is the third EP release by Lisa Mitchell. The EP was released on 4 May 2012 and peaked at number 66 on the Australian ARIA Chart.

Review
Tanya Ali from the AU Review gave the EP 9.6 out of 10, praising the sophistication, growth and song writing maturation saying; "Throughout the whole EP, lyrics are a very strong point and it is clear that Mitchell is a very capable songwriter, tackling deep emotions and issues with tact and poeticism.".
Simon Ubaldi from Beat Magazine said it was an interesting step forward by Mitchell, complemented the vocals but said it "lacks real spirit."

Track listing
 "Spiritus"
 "Diamond in the Rough"
 "I am a Traveller"
 "Erik"
 "Parade Song"

Charts

References

External links
 Lisa Mitchell's official site

2012 EPs
Lisa Mitchell albums
Warner Music Group albums